Nordvestøyane (The Northwestern Islands) is an archipelago in Albert I Land at Spitsbergen, Svalbard. Among the islands in the group are Fuglesongen (4.1 km2) and Klovningen (2.2 km2).

References

Islands of Svalbard